Zvarych is a Ukrainian surname. Notable people with the surname include:

Iryna Zvarych (born 1983), Ukrainian footballer
Roman Zvarych (born 1953), Ukrainian politician
Ihor Zvarych (born 1952), Ukrainian politician, Professor, Doctor of Political Science

Ukrainian-language surnames